Heath Sims (born October 14, 1971) is an American mixed martial artist, Olympic wrestler and MMA trainer. He is a long time training partner of Dan Henderson and a highly respected MMA coach who was the wrestling instructor for the US team on The Ultimate Fighter: United States vs. United Kingdom.

In 2011, he sold his share in Team Quest and moved to Singapore to become the head of the wrestling program at Evolve MMA.

Wrestling
Sim's Father was a freestyle wrestler who competed in the 1972 Olympic trials. As a ninth grader Sims began training with the San Clemente Jets, an amateur wrestling club where kids from all over California came to learn freestyle and Greco-Roman techniques. He won state championships in 1988 and 1989 but instead of going to college and continuing a freestyle career, Sims decided to keep wrestling in the Greco style. He became a junior national team member in 1989 and a world team member in 1990.

In 1996 he quit wrestling in order to work for a computer company but he missed the competition and began to practise again, finishing third at the 1998 U.S. World Team trials. However, in 1999 while he was training at the U.S. Olympic facilities in Colorado Springs Sims flew his snowboard off a mountainside and had to be transported off the mountain by helicopter. His kidney and spleen had been lacerated and his kidney had been nearly severed.

Sims worked delivering groceries for a while but defied doctors orders to start wrestling again. He went to the Olympic Trials and in the best-of-three finals, Sims beat Chris Saba of Colorado Springs, 5-2, in the first match. Saba won the second match, 4-0. Sims won the final match, 3-1.

Olympics
Sims was in Group D of the Wrestling at the 2000 Summer Olympics – Men's Greco-Roman 69 kg. Also in his group were Katsuhiko Nagata and Ruslan Biktyakov, Sims finished third in the group with three classification points and two technical points, leaving him 11th overall.

Mixed Martial Arts
Sims is an MMA coach who has worked with fighters such as Dan Henderson, Matt Lindland, Chael Sonnen, Tarec Saffiedine and Pat Healy at Team Quest and is currently head of the wrestling program at Evolve MMA.

Sims made his MMA debut at 'Xtreme Pancration 2' in Los Angeles in April, 2002, defeating Steve Bruno by decision. In total he fought 11 times in his MMA career, including five fights for Pancrase in Japan and took on top fighters of the era such as Koji Oishi, Antonio McKee, Satoru Kitaoka, Yuki Sasaki and Brad Gumm before retiring in 2006 in order to focus on his coaching commitments.

Mixed martial arts record

|-
| Loss
| align=center| 5–4–2
| John Cronk
| Submission (guillotine choke)
| ACF: Genesis
| 
| align=center| 1
| align=center| 2:46
| Denver, Colorado, United States
| 
|-
| Win
| align=center| 5–3–2
| Steve Berger
| TKO (cut)
| SF 9: Respect
| 
| align=center| 3
| align=center| 1:23
| Oregon, United States
| 
|-
| Loss
| align=center| 4–3–2
| Katsuya Inoue
| TKO (punches)
| Pancrase: Spiral 1
| 
| align=center| 1
| align=center| 4:40
| Tokyo, Japan
| 
|-
| Draw
| align=center| 4–2–2
| Satoru Kitaoka
| Draw
| Pancrase: Brave 8
| 
| align=center| 3
| align=center| 5:00
| Tokyo, Japan
| 
|-
| Win
| align=center| 4–2–1
| Takafumi Ito
| TKO (punches)
| Pancrase: 2004 Neo-Blood Tournament Final
| 
| align=center| 1
| align=center| 3:35
| Tokyo, Japan
| 
|-
| Win
| align=center| 3–2–1
| Brad Gumm
| Submission (punches)
| SF 2: On the Move
| 
| align=center| 2
| align=center| 3:01
| Portland, Oregon
| 
|-
| Draw
| align=center| 2–2–1
| Koji Oishi
| Draw
| Pancrase: Brave 1
| 
| align=center| 3
| align=center| 5:00
| Tokyo, Japan
| 
|-
| Loss
| align=center| 2–2
| Yuki Sasaki
| Decision (unanimous)
| Pancrase: 10th Anniversary Show
| 
| align=center| 3
| align=center| 5:00
| Tokyo, Japan
| 
|-
| Loss
| align=center| 2–1
| Antonio McKee
| Decision (unanimous)
| HFP 2: Hitman Fighting Productions 2
| 
| align=center| 3
| align=center| 5:00
| California, United States
| 
|-
| Win
| align=center| 2–0
| Paul Gardner
| TKO (punches)
| RFC 1: The Beginning
| 
| align=center| 3
| align=center| 3:23
| Las Vegas, Nevada, United States
| 
|-
| Win
| align=center| 1–0
| Steve Bruno
| Decision
| XP 2: Xtreme Pankration 2
| 
| align=center| 2
| align=center| 5:00
| Los Angeles, California, United States
|

References

External links

http://www.sherdog.com/fighter/Heath-Sims-4366
Heath Sims at Sports Reference

Living people
1971 births
American male mixed martial artists
Welterweight mixed martial artists
Mixed martial artists utilizing Greco-Roman wrestling
Wrestlers at the 2000 Summer Olympics
American male sport wrestlers
Olympic wrestlers of the United States